Kyzyl-Bayrak may refer to the following places in Kyrgyzstan:

 Kyzyl-Bayrak, Chuy, village in Kemin District, Chuy Region
 Kyzyl-Bayrak, Kara-Suu, village in Kara-Suu District, Osh Region
 Kyzyl-Bayrak, Özgön, Özgön District, Osh Region